33 Piscium is a binary star system in the zodiac constellation of Pisces. It is visible to the naked eye with an apparent visual magnitude of 4.61. It is moving closer to the Sun with a heliocentric radial velocity of −6.6 km/s.

This system was found to have a variable radial velocity by Leah Allen and Adelaide Hobe of Lick Observatory in 1911. It was identified as a single-lined spectroscopic binary, and the orbital elements were published by Canadian astronomer W. E. Harper in 1926. The pair have an orbital period of 72.93 days and an eccentricity of 0.27. This is a RS Canum Venaticorum variable, indicating a close binary system with active star spots, and has the variable star designation BC Psc.

The primary, component A, is a first-ascent red giant with a stellar classification of K0 IIIb, having chemical abundances that match a first dredge-up mixing model. However, Feuillet et al. At the age of roughly five billion years, the star has expanded to 7 times the radius of the Sun. It is radiating 24 times the Sun's luminosity from its photosphere at an effective temperature of about 4,736 K.

References

K-type giants
Spectroscopic binaries
RS Canum Venaticorum variables
Pisces (constellation)
J00052013-0542275
BD-06 6357
Piscium, 033
000028
000443
0003
Piscium, BC